Air Warning Squadron 9 (AWS-9) was a United States Marine Corps aviation command and control squadron during World War II. The squadron's primary mission was to provide aerial surveillance and early warning of approaching enemy aircraft during amphibious assaults.  Formed in April 1944, the squadron did not deploy overseas until after the end of the war. It arrived in Tokyo Bay to take part in the occupation of Japan only to find out it was not required.  The squadron returned to the U.S. and was decommissioned shortly after in December 1945.  To date, no other Marine Corps squadron has carried the lineage and honors of AWS-9 to include the former Marine Air Control Squadron 9 (MACS-9).

Equipment
AN/TTQ-1 - transportable filter and operations center.
2 x SCR-270s - long range early warning radar.
1 x SCR-527 - medium-range early warning radar used for ground-controlled interception (GCI).
3 x SCR-602s - Light-weight early warning radar to be utilized during the initial stages of an amphibious assault.

Mission

History

Organization and training
Air Warning Squadron 9 was commissioned on April 1, 1944, as part of Marine Air Warning Group 1 at Marine Corps Air Station Cherry Point, North Carolina. On April 21 the squadron moved to Marine Corps Outlying Field Oak Grove in Pollocksville, North Carolina.  Air Warning Group 1 maintained its training equipment at the Pollocksville site and each new Air Warning Squadron commissioned rotated through for their first familiarization on the gear.  While there the squadron conducted more than 250 day interception and 84 night interceptions while working with VMF-511, VMF-512, VMF-513, VMF-514, VMF-314 and VMF-324.  On May 27, 1944, the squadron returned to MCAS Cherry Point in preparation for transfer to the west coast.

AWS-9 departed North Carolina via rail on June 5, 1944, arriving at Marine Corps Air Depot Miramar, California on June 10.  At Miramar, AWS-9 fell under the command of Air Warning Group 2.  In early June the squadron began drawing training equipment from AWG-2 in preparation for additional training throughout Southern California.  Besides MCAD Miramar, the squadron also sent training detachments to Camp Callan near La Jolla and Marine Corps Base Camp Pendleton.  On November 10, 1944, the squadron's duties were changed to that of a replacement training squadron for air warning personnel.  The squadron was relocated to Marine Corps Auxiliary Airfield Gillespie just south east of MCAD Miramar in January 1945.

Deployment to the Pacific and decommissioning
On February 1, 1945, the squadron was reverted to being a combat squadron and began preparing for deployment to the Pacific Theater. The squadron sent detachments to Ream Field in Imperial Beach and Camp Callan. In April the squadron began training on new radar equipment fielded to include the SK-1M, SP-1M, and AN/TPS-1B.

AWS-9 Marine disembarked at Pearl Harbor between Jun 4-6 and moved to Marine Corps Air Station Ewa where it fell under the command of the 3rd Marine Aircraft Wing. While at MCAS Ewa the squadron went to the field for additional training on nighttime GCI.  On August 23, the squadron received a warning order which cancelled all training and order preparation for immediate embarkation on amphibious shipping.  Squadron departed Pearl Harbor on September 13 onboard LST 487 & LST-564.  The LSTs arrived at the fleet anchorage at Eniwetok Atoll on September 23 and remained there until October 7.  On October 18 AWS-9 arrived in Tokyo Bay off Yokosuka Naval Base.  Marine Aircraft Group 31 (MAG-31) informed squadron leadership at that time that its services were not required for occupation duty.

AWS-9 was decommissioned on December 8, 1945.

Commanding officers
Capt Leon H. Connell - April 1, 1944 – February 16, 1945
Capt William A. McCluskey - February 17, 1945 - Unknown

Notable former members
Edward S. Fris - later became a lieutenant general in the Marine Corps serving as the Deputy Commandant for Aviation.

Unit awards
A unit citation or commendation is an award bestowed upon an organization for the action cited. Members of the unit who participated in said actions are allowed to wear on their uniforms the awarded unit citation. What follows is an incomplete list of the awards AWS-9 has been presented with:

See also
 Aviation combat element
 United States Marine Corps Aviation
 List of United States Marine Corps aviation support units

Citations

References

Bibliography

Radar
Inactive units of the United States Marine Corps
Military units and formations established in 1944